Browning Pass may refer to:
 Browning Pass / Nōti Raureka, in the Southern Alps of New Zealand
 Browning Pass (Antarctica), in the Victoria Land region of Antarctica
 Browning Pass, a maritime feature near Port Hardy on the north of Vancouver Island, Canada